The year 2003 is the 3rd year in the history of World Extreme Cagefighting, a mixed martial arts promotion based in the United States. In 2003 WEC held 3 events beginning with, WEC 6: Return of a Legend.

Title fights

Events list

WEC 6: Return of a Legend

WEC 6: Return of a Legend was an event held on March 27, 2003 at the Tachi Palace in Lemoore, California, United States.

Results

WEC 7: This Time It's Personal

WEC 7: This Time It's Personal was an event held on August 9, 2003 at the Tachi Palace in Lemoore, California, United States.

Results

WEC 8: Halloween Fury 2

WEC 8: Halloween Fury 2 was an event held on October 17, 2003 at the Tachi Palace in Lemoore, California, United States.

Results

See also 
 World Extreme Cagefighting
 List of World Extreme Cagefighting champions
 List of WEC events

References

World Extreme Cagefighting events
2003 in mixed martial arts